Western Springs AFC is an association football club in Westmere, Auckland. Western Springs AFC is one of New Zealand's largest clubs. Both the Senior Women's and Senior Men's teams currently play in the Northern League.

The Western Springs' home ground is at Seddon Field on Meola Road in Westmere and also play home games at Cox's Bay, Walker Park and Eastdale Reserve.

History
The current club was formed in 1989, but its history stretches back to 1924 and the foundation of Comrades FC. This team amalgamated with Grey Lynn FC in 1952, briefly becoming Grey Lynn Comrades United, before renaming to Grey Lynn United in 1954. In 1986 this team combined with the New Zealand branch of the Celtic Supporters Club to form Grey Lynn Celtic. It was this team which combined with Point Chevalier AFC (founded 1949) to become Western Springs Association Football Club in 1989.

Current coaches
The Senior Women's and Senior Men's team play in the Lotto NRFL Premier League Northern Region Football League with the women's team coached by former Football Fern Rebecca O'Neill and the men's team by former All White Captain Chris Zoricich.

Current squad

Past and Present day internationals
Women's senior internationals include Football Ferns:
 Rosie White
 Maia Jackman
 Rebecca O'Neill
 Priscilla Duncan
 Abby Erceg
 Daisy Cleverley
 Sarah Morton
 Elizabeth Anton
 Nadia Olla

Men's senior internationals include All Whites:
 Myer Bevan
 Sam Brotherton.

References

External links
Club website

 Association football clubs in Auckland
 1989 establishments in New Zealand